Australia's Best Houses is an Australian lifestyle television program screening on the 7TWO since 2013, hosted by Gary Takle. It showcases exciting and visually stunning house projects in Australia.

See also
 List of programs broadcast by Seven Network
 List of Australian television series

References

7two original programming
2013 Australian television series debuts
Australian non-fiction television series
Australian travel television series